Madonna and Child with Saints is an oil on panel painting by Cima da Conegliano, created in 1504, now in the Gemäldegalerie, Berlin. From left to right the accompanying saints are Peter, Romuald, Benedict of Nursia and Paul.

References

Further reading
Catarina Schmidt Arcangeli: Giovanni Bellini e la pittura veneta a Berlino. Le collezioni di James Simon e Edward Solly alla Gemäldegalerie. Scripta edizioni, Verona 2015, 
Wilhelm Bode, Gustav Ludwig: "Die Altarbilder der Kirche S. Michele di Murano und das Auferstehungsbild des Giovanni Bellini in der Berliner Galerie". In: Jahrbuch der Königlich Preussischen Kunstsammlungen. Band 24, Nr. 2, 1903, pp. 131–146, doi:10.2307/25167477, JSTOR:25167477.
Peter Humfrey: Cima da Conegliano. Cambridge University Press, Cambridge / New York 1983, 
Hans Posse: Die Gemäldegalerie des Kaiser-Friedrich-Museums. Vollständig beschreibender Katalog. Verlag Julius Bard, Berlin 1909
Robert Skwirblies: "Ein Nationalgut, auf das jeder Einwohner stolz sein dürfte. Die Sammlung Solly als Grundlage der Berliner Gemäldegalerie". In: Jahrbuch der Berliner Museen. Band 51, 2009, pp. 69–99, doi:10.2307/25766145, JSTOR:25766145.

Paintings of the Madonna and Child by Cima da Conegliano
1504 paintings
Paintings depicting Paul the Apostle
Paintings depicting Saint Peter
Paintings of Benedict of Nursia
Paintings in the Gemäldegalerie, Berlin
Paintings of Saint Romuald